MKW or mkw may refer to:

 Mario Kart Wii, a 2008 kart racing video game developed and published by Nintendo for the Wii
 MKW, the IATA code for Rendani Airport, Manokwari, West Papua, Indonesia
 MKW, the station code for Malakwal Junction railway station, Punjab, Pakistan
 mkw, the ISO 639-3 code for Kituba language in Republic of the Congo
 Man-Kzin Wars, a military history shared universe first published in 1988